Acroricnus is a genus of wasps belonging to the family Ichneumonidae.

Species
Species within this genus include:
 Acroricnus ambulator
 Acroricnus cubensis
 Acroricnus japonicus
 Acroricnus nigriscutellatus
 Acroricnus peronatus
 Acroricnus seductor
 Acroricnus stylator
 Acroricnus tricolor

References

Cryptinae
Ichneumonidae genera
Taxa named by Julius Theodor Christian Ratzeburg